In mathematics, ψ0(Ωω), widely known as Buchholz's ordinal, is a large countable ordinal that is used to measure the proof-theoretic strength of some mathematical systems. In particular, it is the proof theoretic ordinal of the subsystem -CA0 of second-order arithmetic; this is one of the "big five" subsystems studied in reverse mathematics (Simpson 1999).

Definition

References
 G. Takeuti, Proof theory, 2nd edition 1987 
 K. Schütte, Proof theory, Springer 1977 

Ordinal numbers
Proof theory